Kehilat Gesher is a Liberal Jewish synagogue located in the 17th arrondissement of Paris and founder of the Francophone Federation of Liberal Judaism and the Assembly of Liberal Judaism of France. 

Its rabbi, American Tom Cohen, founded the synagogue to be Jewish and Franco-American. The synagogue was founded in 1993 and today has around 190 families. 

Cohen is married to Pauline Bebe, the first female Rabbi in France and the founder of the Communauté juive libérale d'Île-de-France (CJL).

Prayers are held in Hebrew, English, and French.

References

External links 

 Site de la communauté Kehilat Gesher

American diaspora in Europe
Reform synagogues in France
Synagogues in Paris
1993 establishments in France
17th arrondissement of Paris
Judaism in France